Home and Away: Secrets and the City is an exclusive-to-video and DVD special of Australia's most popular soap opera Home and Away.  In 2002, it was only released on video and a year later it received a DVD release.  It is hosted by Home and Away star Tammin Sursok — in character as Dani Sutherland, not as herself — and contains three episodes, two of which were aired on TV: Shattered Hearts and Broken Dreams, from the fifteenth season of Home and Away, while the third episode, Secrets and the City will never be aired on TV; it is only to be seen on the video and DVD.

The story follows the breakup of the Sutherland family as a secret from Rhys' past comes back to haunt him. Years ago, Rhys had an affair with Angie Russell and now she's living in Summer Bay with her son Dylan. Angie then reveals to Dylan than he is Rhys' son and he can't see Rhys' daughter Kirsty any more because they are brother and sister.  Shelley discovers his secret when she listens to a tape that recorded Angie talking to Rhys. At a family dinner, Rhys tells all to his family hurting Kirsty the most. The following day, the girls find a note from Rhys saying that he has left for good.  Dani and Josh, along with Hayley and Noah, search for Rhys in the City.

Episodes

Cast

Main Cast
 Tammin Sursok - Dani Sutherland
 Rebecca Cartwright - Hayley Smith
 Beau Brady - Noah Lawson
 Chris Egan - Nick Smith
 Christie Hayes - Kirsty Sutherland
 Kate Garven - Jade Sutherland
 Mitch Firth - Seb Miller
 Paula Forrest - Shelley Sutherland
 Michael Beckley - Rhys Sutherland
 Ray Meagher - Alf Stewart
 Norman Coburn - Donald Fisher
 Kate Ritchie - Sally Fletcher
 Ada Nicodemou - Leah Patterson
 Susie Rugg - Brodie Hanson
 Danny Raco - Alex Poulos
 Daniel Collopy - Josh West
 Ben Unwin - Jesse McGregor
 Martin Dingle-Wall - Flynn Saunders
 Lynne McGranger - Irene Roberts
 Lyn Collingwood - Colleen Smart
 Sebastian Elmaloglou - Max Sutherland

Guest Cast
 Laurie Foell - Angie Russell
 Brett Hicks-Maitland - Dylan Russell
 Cornelia Frances - Morag Bellingham
 Harry & James Roberts - V.J. Patterson
 Stephen Leeder - Inspector Carter
 Julieanne Newbould - Jackie West

DVD

Reception
Secrets and the City was a let down to fans of the show as they expected more to come from Australia's first DVD of Home and Away.  Two episodes which had already aired on TV and the special episode was only 3 minutes longer than a normal episode.  The special features on the release were a great contribution, cast interviews and behind-the-scenes with Bec Cartwright and Beau Brady.

See also
 Home and Away
 Home and Away: Hearts Divided
 Home and Away: Romances
 Home and Away: Weddings

References

External links
 Home and Away: Secrets and the City at the Internet Movie Database
 Home and Away at the Internet Movie Database

Australian television soap operas
Seven Network original programming
Television shows set in New South Wales
S
pl:Home and Away